Saccharibacillus is a genus of bacteria from the family of Paenibacillaceae.

References

Further reading 
 
 

Paenibacillaceae
Bacteria genera